The Shoshone was a named passenger train of the Chicago, Burlington and Quincy Railroad and its subsidiary the Colorado and Southern Railway. The train operated between Denver, Colorado and Billings, Montana via Casper, Wyoming and the Wind River Canyon. The train operated until September 1, 1967. In 1946 the train featured standard heavyweight sleeping car accommodation, dining car service, and reclining chair cars. By 1967 the name was dropped and the train consisted of only a modernized heavyweight coach and storage mail cars which were picked up and dropped off en route.

References 

 Timetable, Chicago Burlington and Quincy Railroad, 1946
 "Passenger Trains of Denver The Decade Before Amtrak: 1960-1970", John D. Mummert, 2009

Named passenger trains of the United States
Passenger trains of the Chicago, Burlington and Quincy Railroad
Railway services discontinued in 1967